During the 2000–01 English football season, West Bromwich Albion F.C. competed in the Football League First Division.

Season summary
Megson's rejuvenation of the side continued in 2000–01, as Albion finished sixth, their highest league finish since relegation in 1986. They qualified for the Division One promotion playoffs, where they faced Bolton Wanderers in the semi-finals. The first leg finished 2–2 after Albion had led 2–0. Bolton won the second leg 3–0 to reach the final 5–2 on aggregate.

Albion's home match against Barnsley on 1 January 2001 was the last to be played in front of the Rainbow Stand, which was subsequently demolished before construction began on the new East Stand.

Final league table

Results
West Bromwich Albion's score comes first

Legend

Football League First Division

First Division play-offs

FA Cup

League Cup

First-team squad
Squad at end of season

Left club during season

Reserve squad

Notes

References

West Bromwich Albion F.C. seasons
West Bromwich Albion